Professor Edwin Douglas Ramsay Shearman DSc FReng FIET FRMetS FIEEE (17 November 1924 - 13 December 2019) was a shortwave radio and radar pioneer, whose discoveries aided fishing, shipping, and search and rescue. In 1986 he was awarded the IET Faraday Medal.

Early life
Edwin Douglas Ramsay Shearman was born on 17 November 1924 in Cambridge, the son of Sir Harold Shearman, a socialist educationalist, and Lady Shearman, a teacher from County Durham.  Shearman's parents adopted Reggie Khosla whose father had been the judge on the trial of Vinayak Godse, the assassin of Mahatma Gandhi.

Shearman was educated at Bedford Modern School and King's College School, before going up to Imperial College London where he rowed and graduated with a first class degree in Electrical Engineering.

Career
In 1946, Shearman began his career with the Admiralty Signal Establishment with a focus on high frequency communications following which he worked alongside Sir Robert Watson-Watt and Arnold Wilkins, considered to be the first radar pioneers in the UK.  His early discoveries in short-wave radio (high-frequency radio waves) were able to accurately assess sea conditions.  In 1957, Shearman tracked the satellite Sputnik 1 and was able to greatly assist in the understanding of the ionosphere.  He subsequently worked with the Royal Air Force and US Air Force before joining NASA for two years to help design the Alouette satellite which made further important advances in the understanding of the upper half of the ionosphere.  After NASA, Shearman worked for the Ministry of Defence.

In 1962, Shearman made a complete change to his career and became Senior Lecturer in Electromagnetism at the University of Birmingham and engaged in setting up the Radio Research Group there.  At Birmingham, Shearman built up his own research program on a Moon-bounce project, and a number of professors and leaders in industry and government research stemmed from the programme. Shearman continued to advise the Ministry of Defence and GCHQ.

Shearman was awarded the Institution of Electrical Engineers (now IET) Faraday Medal in 1986 and was made an Institute of Electrical and Electronics Engineers (IEEE) Fellow in 1982.

Family life
In 1955, Shearman married Rosalind Morris, a chiropodist, voluntary social worker, and Liberal Party activist with a passion for ballet.  They had three daughters.

References

External links 
Oral-History:Edwin Douglas Ramsay Shearman - Engineering and Technology History Wiki
Edwin Douglas Ramsay Shearman at ResearchGate

1924 births
2019 deaths
People from Cambridge
People educated at Bedford Modern School
People educated at King's College School, London
Alumni of Imperial College London
Academics of the University of Birmingham
Radar pioneers
Fellow Members of the IEEE